Ernest Hogan (born Ernest Reuben Crowdus; 1865 – May 20, 1909) was the first African-American entertainer to produce and star in a Broadway show (The Oyster Man in 1907) and helped to popularize the musical genre of ragtime.

A native of Bowling Green, Kentucky, as a teenager Hogan worked in traveling minstrel shows as a dancer, musician, and comedian. In 1895 Hogan composed several popular songs, including "La Pas Ma La" and "All Coons Look Alike to Me". The success of the latter song created many derogatory imitations, known as "coon songs" because of their use of racist and stereotypical images of black people.

Hogan was considered one of the most talented performers and comedians of his day. His contribution to the racist "coon song" craze haunted him—before his death he stated that he regretted using the racial slur in his song.

Early years
He was born Ernest Reuben Crowders in the Shake Rag District of Bowling Green, Kentucky, in 1865. Little to nothing is known about his childhood, but as a teenager, he traveled with a minstrel troupe called the Georgia Graduate, performing as a dancer, musician, and comedian. During this time he changed his name to Hogan because "Irish performers were in vogue." He would also claim that he took the name to honor a Judge Hogan of Bowling Green, for whom his mother had worked as a cook.  A few years after changing his name to Hogan, Ernest started finding success in solo acts in New York City. Hogan likely performed in blackface during this time, as he sometimes did later in his career.

Family life
Ernest Hogan was believed to have been married twice. He was first wed to a youthful singer named Mattie Wilkes. She was a popular soprano who had been performing in vaudeville shows with him; they married around 1901 or 1902. Hogan was later reportedly married to a woman named Louise, who helped him organize concerts in the early 1900s. The specific dates of these marriages are not known; Hogan did not have children with either of his wives.

His earliest ragtime composition

It was also during this time that Hogan created a comedy dance called the "La Pas Ma La"  , which consisted of a walk forward with three steps back. In 1895, he wrote and composed a song based on this dance called "pasmala" . The song's chorus was:

Hand upon yo' head, let your mind roll back,
Back, back back and look at the stars
Stand up rightly, dance it brightly
That's the Pas Ma La.

Hogan followed this song with the hit "All Coons Look Alike to Me". Hogan was evidently not the originator of the song's lyrics, having appropriated them after hearing a pianist in a Chicago salon playing a song titled "All Pimps Look Alike to Me". Hogan merely changed the words slightly, substituting the word "coon" for "pimp" and added a cakewalk syncopation to the music, which he had heard being played in back rooms and cafes. The song eventually sold over a million copies.

Hogan's use of the racial slur "coon" in the song infuriated many African Americans. Some black performers made a point of substituting the word "boys" for "coons" whenever they sang it. In addition, the success of this song created many imitations, which became known as "coon songs" because of their use of extremely racist and stereotypical images of blacks. In Hogan's later years he evidently felt shame and a sense of "race betrayal" for the song. Ironically, the word "coon" was more socially acceptable than "pimp" among white audiences of the time.

The controversy over the song has, to some degree, caused Hogan to be overlooked as one of the originators of ragtime, which has been called the first truly American musical genre. Hogan's songs were among the first published ragtime songs and the first to use the term "rag" in their sheet music copy. While Hogan made no claims to having exclusively created ragtime, fellow black musician Tom Fletcher said Hogan was the "first to put on paper the kind of rhythm that was being played by non-reading musicians." When the ragtime championship was held as part of the 1900 World Competition in New York, semifinalists played Hogan's "All Coons Look Alike to Me" to prove their skill.

As Hogan said shortly before he died,

Death
In January 1908, Hogan collapsed onstage in New York and again in Boston while performing in "The Oyster Man." Forced to leave the show, Hogan spent the remainder of his life trying but failing to recuperate.  He died from tuberculosis in Lakewood, New Jersey, on May 20, 1909.

See also

 African-American music
 African-American musical theater
 Coon song
 Ragtime

References

1865 births
Hogan Ernest
19th-century African-American male singers
African-American cultural history
American entertainers
Male actors from Kentucky
Musicians from Bowling Green, Kentucky
Ragtime composers
Singers from Kentucky
Songwriters from Kentucky
Vaudeville performers
African-American singer-songwriters
20th-century African-American male singers